Three Moon is a rural locality in the North Burnett Region, Queensland, Australia. In the  Three Moon had a population of 147 people.

History 
Three Moon State School opened on 24 January 1927 and closed on 22 August 1948.

In the  Three Moon had a population of 147 people.

References 

North Burnett Region
Localities in Queensland